Reichart, Reichhart or Reichardt are surnames, and may refer to:

 Israel Reichart, Israeli biologist and agriculturist
 Johann Reichhart, German executioner
 Johann Friedrich Reichardt, Prussian composer
 Kelly Reichardt, American film director
 Louis Reichardt, American big-mountain mountaineer
 Margaretha Reichardt (1907-1984), German textile designer and former Bauhaus student
 Martin Reichardt (born 1969), German politician
 Rick Reichardt, American baseball player
 Patricia "Peppermint Patty" Reichardt, a character in the Peanuts comic strip.
 Werner E. Reichardt, German physicist and biologist

also
 Robert Reichert, mayor of Macon, Georgia

Surnames
German-language surnames
Jewish surnames